HMS Dominica was the French letter of marque schooner Duc de Wagram, which the British captured in 1809 in the Leeward Islands and took into the Royal Navy in 1810. The American privateer Decatur captured her in 1813 in a notable single-ship action. However,  recaptured her in 1814. She was wrecked in 1815

Origins
Dominica was originally built in the Chesapeake area as a 14-gun, three-masted schooner in around 1805. Then in 1809 she was armed at Guadeloupe as the letter of marque Duc de Wagram. The British captured her in 1809 and Admiral Lord Alexander Cochrane had her surveyed in Antigua. The results were so good that he purchased her for the Royal Navy.

British Service
Between November 1810 and June 1811 Dominica underwent refitting at Deptford. In May 1811 Lieutenant Robert Hocking commissioned her for the Irish Sea and the Channel. Then on 23 November he sailed her to the West Indies.

In August 1812 Dominica captured three merchant vessels. The first was the Indiana (7 August), which was sailing to San Juan, Porto Rico, with a cargo of flour and lard. The second was the Endeavour (26 August), which was sailing to Norfolk, Virginia, with molasses and rum. The third was the Amphitrite (also 26 August), sailing to New London with rum, coffee, sugar, and the like.

On 11 November 1812, Hocking and Dominica captured the American privateer Providence, of Providence, Rhode Island, at 19 degrees latitude and 63 degrees 15 minutes longitude after an "anxious chase of ten hours". She had a crew of 60 men and was pierced for 12 guns but had thrown all but four overboard during the chase. She had been cruising for 30 days but had made no captures.

Capture
Lieutenant George William Barrette took command later in 1812. On 5 August 1813 Dominica was escorting the packet ship Princess Charlotte when she encountered the American privateer Decatur under the command of Captain Dominique Diron.

Decatur was more lightly armed, though more heavily manned, and prevailed in the fight. The British lost 18 men killed, 42 wounded, and 70 captured, including the wounded, with Barrette being among the killed. (One of the wounded was an 11-year-old ship's boy, wounded in three places.) The Americans had five men killed and 15 wounded. The court martial on 3 January 1815 of the surviving officers and men of Dominica acquitted them for her loss.

The British agent at Charleston, South Carolina, wrote a letter suggesting that the cause of the loss was "to be attributed entirely to the Want of Knowledge of and Experience in the Management of a Schooner, on the part of Captain Barrette... and the Vessel herself being extremely difficult to Work."  The same agent also reported that Decaturs crew was of French origin, "chiefly, if not all, Blacks, and Mulattoes" and that on boarding they had behaved with utmost cruelty, slaughtering the wounded on deck.  A letter from the Judge of the District Court stated that the prisoners had been treated with the utmost humanity. The same letter described Dominica as little damaged by shot because she had been taken by boarding. Dominica was recommissioned in Charleston as the French letter of marque Dominique.

Recapture
On 22 May 1814 Majestic recaptured Dominica. At the time of her recapture, Dominica was sailing under a letter of marque, had a crew of 36 men under the command of Beusen, master, and was armed with four 6-pounder guns. She was carrying a cargo of rice, tobacco, wine, and naval stores. The re-captured Dominica went into Halifax.

Fate
Lieutenant Robert Gibson recommissioned her on the Halifax station in October 1814. Lieutenant Richard Crawford replaced him in 1814. On 15 August 1815, Dominica was escorting a convoy to the West Indies when she was wrecked on the reefs off Bermuda.

Notes, citations, and references
Notes

Citations

References
 
 
 
 
 
 
 

Schooners of the Royal Navy
Maritime incidents in 1815
Privateer ships of France
Privateer ships of the United States
1800s ships
War of 1812 ships of the United Kingdom